"Enemies" is a song by American rapper and singer Post Malone, featuring fellow American rapper DaBaby. It was sent to rhythmic contemporary radio as the fourth single from Post Malone's third studio album, Hollywood's Bleeding on September 17, 2019. The song was written by the artists, along with Billy Walsh and producer Louis Bell. The track became Malone's seventh number one (and his fourth from Hollywood's Bleeding) and DaBaby's first on Billboards Rhythmic Songs Chart in November 2019.

The song peaked at number 16 on the US Billboard Hot 100.

Critical reception
The song received acclaim mostly for DaBaby's guest appearance. Jayson Greene at Pitchfork praised DaBaby's guest verse on the song, noting that he "crushes his turn". Writing for Vulture, Craig Jenkins thought that DaBaby even "stole the show" on the song and described his verse as a "passive-aggressive jab at backstabbing friends". However, in a review of the song's parent album, Chris DeVille from Stereogum opined that DaBaby along with Meek Mill merely delivered "the requisite rap verse on a Top 40 single". Rolling Stones Nick Catucci pointed out how DaBaby's flow "highlights Post Malone's technical laxity as a rapper, but also his unerring instinct for what will cut through the ambient noise in the car, at the supermarket or during hour four of the frat party".

Personnel
Credits adapted from Tidal.

 Post Malone – vocals, songwriting
 DaBaby – featured vocals, songwriting
 Louis Bell – production, recording, vocal production, programming, songwriting
 Billy Walsh – songwriting
 Manny Marroquin – mixing
 Chris Galland – mixing assistant
 Robin Florent – mixing assistant
 Scott Desmarais – mixing assistant
 Jeremie Inhaber – mixing assistant

Charts

Weekly charts

Year-end charts

Certifications

Release history

References

External links

2019 songs
2019 singles
Post Malone songs
DaBaby songs
Songs written by Louis Bell
Songs written by Post Malone
Songs written by DaBaby
Song recordings produced by Louis Bell
Pop-rap songs